The Poolesville Historic District is a national historic district located at Poolesville, Montgomery County, Maryland.  It consists of 33 buildings of local architectural and historical significance including structures representing a diversity of styles, materials, and uses, and includes residential, ecclesiastical, and commercial architecture, as well as an assorted number of small domestic dependencies, such as dairies and smokehouses.

It was listed on the National Register of Historic Places in 1975.

References

External links
, including photo in 2003, at Maryland Historical Trust website
Boundary Map of the Poolesville Historic District, Montgomery County, at Maryland Historical Trust

Historic districts on the National Register of Historic Places in Maryland
Historic districts in Montgomery County, Maryland
Federal architecture in Maryland
Historic American Buildings Survey in Maryland
National Register of Historic Places in Montgomery County, Maryland